The 1965 All-Ireland Senior Camogie Championship was the high point of the 1965 season in Camogie. The championship was won by Dublin who defeated Tipperary by a 13-point margin in the final.

Arrangements
Goals from Ann Carroll and Margo Loughnane gave Tipperary a 2-6 to 0-6 victory over Cork in the Munster final.

Final
Two goals each from Kit Kehoe and Judy Doyle in the third quarter decided the outcome of the final. Agnes Hourigan wrote in the Irish Press
Four great goals flashed home in a decisive offensive early in the second half by the quick silver Dublin forwards ended Tipperary’s hopes of camogie honours in a spectacular and often thrilling All Ireland final.

Date of Final
It marked an important departure in the history of the competition, the first time that the camogie final was given an established date on the calendar, being played in Croke Park on the Sunday after the All-Ireland final for men’s teams in hurling. Of the previous 34 finals, eight had been played in August, five had been played in September, 12 had been played in October, six in November, two in December and one the following July

Final stages

MATCH RULES
50 minutes
Replay if scores level
Maximum of 3 substitutions

See also
 All-Ireland Senior Hurling Championship
 Wikipedia List of Camogie players
 National Camogie League
 Camogie All Stars Awards
 Ashbourne Cup

References

External links
 Camogie Association
 Historical reports of All Ireland finals
 All-Ireland Senior Camogie Championship: Roll of Honour
 Camogie on facebook
 Camogie on GAA Oral History Project

All-Ireland Senior Camogie Championship
1965
All-Ireland Senior Camogie Championship
All-Ireland Senior Camogie Championship